Porodična Manufaktura Crnog Hleba (trans. Rye Bread Family Manufacture) was a Yugoslav rock band and a theatrical troupe formed in Belgrade in 1968. 

The band was formed by vocalist and guitarist Maja de Rado, guitarist Jugoslav Vlahović and guitarist Slobodan Kuzmanović, who were later joined by double bass player Petar Pavišić. The band performed acoustic music and was one of the pioneers of the Yugoslav acoustic rock scene. They held happenings in Atelje 212 theatre in Belgrade, gaining the attention of the public with lyrics and compositions written by their teenage frontess. They released their only studio album in 1974, disbanding a year later. After the group ended their activity, Vlahović would go on to become one of the most notable cartoonists and album cover designers in Yugoslavia.

Band history
The band was formed in 1968 by Maja de Rado (vocals and twelve string guitar), Jugoslav Vlahović (prim, acoustic guitar) and Slobodan Kuzmanović (acoustic guitar). Being close relatives, they decided to name the band Porodična Manufaktura Crnog Hleba. At the beginning of 1969, they were joined by Petar Pavišić (double bass). On their live performances they performed with a flutist; flutists Vlada Bogosavljević, Sreten Tasić and Branko Malkoč all performed with the band on different occasions. The band soon gained attention of the media thanks to the lyrics and compositions of Maja de Rado, who was only fifteen years old at the time of the band's formation.

The band held happenings in the basement of Atelje 212 theatre. During 1972 and 1973 in Atelje 212 they performed the alternative play Porodična manufaktura crnog hleba – balada Maje de Rado (Rye Bread Family Manufacture – A Ballad by Maja de Rado), during which they performed their music. They had numerous appearances on rock concerts in Belgrade Sports Hall, and in 1972 they performed, alongside Pop Mašina, S Vremena Na Vreme and other bands on the large open-air concert at Belgrade's Hajdučka česma. In 1973, the band released their first record, a 7" single with the songs "Mudra Mande" ("Wise Mande") and "Pitaš me" ("You're Asking Me") through PGP-RTB record label. The song "Mudra Mande" was sung in a dialect spoken on the island of Brač. On this island they also prepared songs for their first album.

In 1974 they released their debut and only album, Stvaranje (The Creation). The album, besides new songs, featured the songs "Čovek i pas" ("Man and Dog"), "Imam li što od tog" ("What's in It for Me") and "Nisam smio" ("I Shouldn't Have"), previously released on 7" singles. All the songs were written by Maja de Rado, while Vlahović wrote the arrangements and produced the album. Following the release of Stvaranje they started performing a play with the same name at Atelje 212, during which they played photographic slides and short films. During these performances they were joined by painter Dobrivoje Petrović on sitar. 

In 1975, at the time of the recording of their second studio album, male members of the band all went to serve their mandatory stint in the Yugoslav army. Thus Porodična Manufaktura Crnog Hleba ended their activity.

Post breakup
After the breakup of the band, Maja de Rado dedicated herself to classical music and meditation poetry and prose. Vlahović started working as a designer and cartoonist. In 1978 he became the cartoonist and illustration editor in the magazine NIN. He designed a large number of album covers, including the covers for the albums by Pop Mašina, S Vremena Na Vreme, Smak, Suncokret, Riblja Čorba, Bulevar, Alisa and other acts.

In 1994, the band's song "Nešto" ("Something") was released on Komuna compilation album Sve smo mogli mi: Akustičarska muzika (We Could Have Done All: Acoustic Music), which featured songs by Yugoslav acoustic rock acts.

Slobodan Kuzmanović died on 26 January 2014. He was 61 years old.

Discography

Studio albums
Stvaranje (1974)

Singles
"Mudra Mande" / "Pitaš me" (1973)
"Nešto" / "Čovjek i pas" (1973)
"Imam li što od tog" / "Nisam smio" (1974)

References

External links 
Porodična Manufaktura Crnog Hleba at Discogs
Porodična Manufaktura Crnog Hleba at Prog Archives

Serbian rock music groups
Serbian progressive rock groups
Serbian art rock groups
Yugoslav rock music groups
Yugoslav progressive rock groups
Yugoslav art rock groups
Musical groups from Belgrade
Musical groups established in 1968
Musical groups disestablished in 1975